MacDonald is an unincorporated community and coal town  in Fayette County, West Virginia, United States.

The community was named after Symington McDonald, a mining official.

References 

Unincorporated communities in West Virginia
Unincorporated communities in Fayette County, West Virginia
Coal towns in West Virginia